Hélder Gomes Morim (born 14 May 2001) is a Portuguese professional footballer who plays as an midfielder for Liga Portugal 2 club Trofense on loan from Chaves.

Professional career
Gomes is a youth product of the academies of Rio Ave and Leixões, and began his senior career with Leixões in 2021 in the Liga Portugal 2. On 29 July 2022, he transferred to the Primeira Liga club Chaves.

Playing style
Morim is a consistent left-footed midfielder who is excellent in build-up play, and has a great long pass. He has good speed, but is a little slight in build. He originally played as a left-back, before transitioning to midfield.

References

External links
 

2001 births
Living people
People from Póvoa de Varzim
Portuguese footballers
Association football midfielders
Primeira Liga players
Liga Portugal 2 players
Leixões S.C. players
G.D. Chaves players
C.D. Trofense players